Rud-e Hasan or Rud Hasan may refer to:
 Rud-e Hasan-e Olya
 Rud-e Hasan-e Sofla